Hit List TV was an Australian music show that first aired in 2009 to 2012. It was produced by Southern Cross Broadcasting and aired on a number of television channels within Australia. It was broadcast on Southern Cross Ten at 10:00 am weekends.

History
In mid-late 2009, regional affiliate Southern Cross Ten dropped the show Video Hits on TEN, in order to air their own chart show, known as Hit List TV, based upon the nightly radio show of the same name that went to air across Macquarie Southern Cross hit stream stations. The show was hosted by Tim Dormer & Renee Peterson (hosts of radio program The Hit List).

Availability 
Hit List TV was broadcast on Southern Cross Ten, as well as Tasmanian Digital Television and Darwin Digital Television. They all aired the show on weekends at 10:00 am.

See also

 List of Australian music television shows

External links
Official site

2009 Australian television series debuts
2011 Australian television series endings
Australian music chart television shows
Television shows set in Australia